Mantelliceras is an extinct ammonoid cephalopod genus belonging to the family  Acanthoceratidae and type for the subfamily Mantelliceratinae, that lived from the Late Albian to the late Cenomanian stage of the Late Cretaceous.

Description
Mantelliceras is characterized by a strongly ribbed, moderately involute shell with a moderately wide umbilicus, and rounded whorl section. The final whorl leaves inner whorls partly exposed. High standing ribs cross over the venter smoothly. Primary ribs arise from the umbilical wall. Secondaries, usually one per intervening space, arise higher on the flanks. Species of Mantelliceras are known to reach a diameter of about 13 centimeters.

Distribution
Species of Mantelliceras''' have been found in Cretaceous sediments in Angola, France, Germany, Japan, Mexico, Russia, Spain, the United Kingdom, and United States.

Species
Species of Manatelliceras include: 
 M. brazoense Böse 1928
 M. cantianum Spath 1926
 M. charlestoni Kellum & Mintz 1962
 M. corroyi Fabre 1940
 M. lymense Spath 1926
 M. mantelli Sowerby 1814
 M. portalesi Kellum & Mintz 1962
 M. saxbii Sharpe 1857
 M. wacoense'' Böse 1928

References

 W.J. Arkell, et al. 1957. Mesozoic Ammonoidea; Treatise on Invertebrate Paleontology, Part L, Mollusca 4. Geological Society of America and University of Kansas Press.

Ammonitida genera
Late Cretaceous ammonites of Europe
Fossil taxa described in 1903
Ammonites of Europe
Albian genus first appearances
Cenomanian genus extinctions
Acanthoceratidae